Barbara Gaines (born June 1, 1956) is a former executive producer of the Late Show with David Letterman.  She held that position from May 2000 to the show's finale in 2015. She graduated in 1979 from Ithaca College with a BA in educational television.

She started on The David Letterman Show as a production assistant in 1980 before being promoted to production coordinator and assistant producer.  As a producer, she was nominated for the Emmy eleven times and won five consecutive awards for Outstanding Variety, Music or Comedy Program.  She became one of the most popular staff members with audiences, appearing regularly on the show in segments such as "How's The Weather?", in which Letterman would call a random number in a phone book Gaines picked out and ask about the weather.

She also worked on production for the Orange Bowl Parade; One of the Boys, a comedy series starring Mickey Rooney, Nathan Lane and Dana Carvey; and  The $50,000 Pyramid.

Gaines made the 2008 Ten Amazing Gay Women in Showbiz list.

Personal
Gaines met her partner Aari Blake Ludvigsen in 1991. Their son, Simon Michael Ludvigsen Gaines, was born in 2006. In 2008, the New York Post reported that Gaines and Ludvigsen had married in San Francisco. Gaines belongs to Congregation Beit Simchat Torah (CBST), the Lesbian, Gay, Bisexual, Transgender, Queer and Straight Synagogue in New York, and in 2010 did a video with the Strength Through Community project at CBST about her life and experiences.

References

External links
 

Television producers from New York (state)
American women television producers
20th-century American Jews
Ithaca College alumni
George W. Hewlett High School alumni
People from The Five Towns, New York
Emmy Award winners
1957 births
Living people
LGBT people from New York (state)
LGBT Jews
Late Show with David Letterman
21st-century American Jews